Biljana Jovanović (28 January 1953 – 11 March 1996) was a Serbian author, peace activist, and feminist. She published poetry, novels and plays and was heavily involved in the peace movement during the breakup of Yugoslavia in the early 1990s.

Life
Jovanović was born in Belgrade, Yugoslavia, (now in Serbia), on 28 January 1953. Her father was a well known Yugoslav, Montenegrin and Serbian politician, Batrić Jovanović, and her brother was a jurist, professor at the University of Novi Sad, Pavle Jovanović. She graduated from the University of Belgrade with a degree in philosophy. She married the writer Dragan Lakićević while a student; they later divorced. In the late 1980s she married the Slovenian sociologist Rastko Močnik and they split their time between Ljubljana, Slovenia, and Belgrade. Jovanović died of a brain tumor in Belgrade on 11 March 1996.

Activities
She published a book of poems in 1977, while still a student and followed it with a novel, Avala is Falling (Pada Avala), the following year. Jovanović published two more novels in the early 1980s, The Dogs and the Others (Psi i ostali) in 1980 and My Soul, My Only Child (Duša, jedinica moja) in 1984. Interspersed were four plays, two each in the 1980s and 1990s.

Jovanović was also a public intellectual and helped to found the Committee for the Defense of Artistic Freedoms (Odbor za zaštitu umetničkih sloboda), a part of the Association of Serbian Writers (Udruženje književnika Srbije), in 1982, serving as its president for a time. As the association grew more nationalistic in the late 1980s, Jovanović distanced herself from it. She embraced the anti-nationalist movement in the early 1990s, organizing protests calling for peace and tolerance. She was one of the founders of Civil Resistance Movement (Civilni pokret otpora), in 1992 and, later that year, of the Flying Classroom Workshop (Leteća učionica radionica), an artistic project trying to connect Yugoslavs in an already partly dismembered country.

Notes

References

1953 births
1996 deaths
Serbian feminists
Yugoslav writers